Centreville is a city in Bibb County, Alabama, United States. At the 2020 census, the population was 2,800. The city is the county seat of Bibb County.

Geography
The city is bordered to the west by the city of Brent by the Cahaba River.

The city is located in the central part of the state along U.S. Route 82, which runs from southeast to northwest to the north of the city, leading southeast  to Montgomery, the state capital, and northwest  to Tuscaloosa. Alabama State Routes 25 and 219 both run through the center of the city from south to north. AL-25 leads northeast  to Montevallo and southwest  to Greensboro. AL-219 leads north  to Alabama State Route 5 north of Brent and south  to Selma.

Climate
The climate in this area is characterized by hot, humid summers and generally mild to cool winters. According to the Köppen Climate Classification system, Centreville has a humid subtropical climate, abbreviated Cfa on climate maps.

Centreville is the site of the highest recorded temperature in the state of Alabama, when on September 6, 1925, the temperature reached . The data below are for the years 1916 to 1974.

Demographics

2020 census

As of the 2020 United States census, there were 2,800 people, 947 households, and 599 families residing in the city.

2010 census
As of the census of 2010, there were 2,778 people, 1,066 households, and 729 families residing in the city. The racial makeup of the city was 72.2% White, 23.7% Black or African American, 0.3% Native American, 0.4% Asian, 2.4% from other races, and 1.1% from two or more races. 3.0% of the population were Hispanic or Latino of any race.

There were 1,066 households, of which 29.7% had children under the age of 18 living with them, 47.2% were married couples living together, 15.9% had a female householder with no husband present, and 31.6% were non-families. 29.0% of all households were made up of individuals, and 14.2% had someone living alone who was 65 years of age or older. The average household size was 2.50 and the average family size was 3.07

In the city, the population was spread out, with 23.8% under the age of 18, 9.0% from 18 to 24, 24.6% from 25 to 44, 24.6% from 45 to 64, and 18.1% who were 65 years of age or older. The median age was 39 years. For every 100 females, there were 92.6 males. For every 100 females age 18 and over, there were 95.0 males.

The median income for a household in the city was $31,642, and the median income for a family was $58,000. Males had a median income of $37,614 versus $17,088 for females. The per capita income for the city was $18,172. About 13.5% of families and 15.9% of the population were below the poverty line, including 10.1% of those under age 18 and 1.1% of those age 65 or over.

History
The Cahaba River falls near Centreville, which made the town a strategic location for transportation through the region. The first post office in Bibb County was established in Centreville in 1821. Sarah Willis Chotard obtained a patent for land in this area in 1823 and began moving squatters off the land and laid out a plot for the new town of Centreville.

In 1829, Centreville became the permanent seat for Bibb County after several years of debate and different locations of the county courthouse, and the town was incorporated in 1832. Centreville's historic district is listed on the National Register of Historic Places.

On March 25th, 2021, a violent tornado hit the southern and eastern portions of Centreville, causing significant damage to the area and rendering the Bibb County Airport a total loss.

1910 lynching

In 1910, a white woman by the name of Mrs. Crow gave birth to a child of "doubtful color", who was thought by many to be the product of a relationship between Crow and an African American, and she was accused of having such a relationship. At first she vigorously denied it, but then – under intense peer pressure – she confessed to the baby's origin but claimed that she had been raped. When asked if she knew who raped her, Crow gave them the name of Grant Richardson, an African American who lived near the Braehead Slope Mine Camp, northeast of Centreville. The miners and other local residents were so incensed at the affair that they decided to apply "summary vengeance" to Richardson as soon as they knew that the sheriff had apprehended him.

Deputy Sheriff Cam Riley apprehended Richardson on October 12, 1910, and was returning him to the jail at Centreville for processing and trial, but was waylaid by a lynch mob. The mob took Richardson from Riley and shot the suspect. Chief Deputy Sheriff Charles Oakley investigated the scene as soon as word of the incident reached him, but other than the body, the shells, and the blood, there was little usable evidence to be found, much less witnesses. A coroner's inquest was held as soon as a special coroner was appointed, but there is no known result of that inquest. This was the first recorded lynching to take place in Bibb County.

It is unknown whether charges of either filing false charges resulting in a murder or miscegenation were filed against Crow, but it is known by those aware of Richardson that he had lived in the area for a number of years with a fair reputation prior to the incident.

Education

Centreville is served by the Bibb County Public School District. Schools in Centreville include Bibb County High School (grades 9 through 12) and Centreville Middle School (grades 5 through 8). Cahawba Christian Academy is a private school serving grades pre-K to 12.

Media
 WBIB 1110 AM (Southern Gospel)
 The Bibb Voice BibbVoice.com (Online News Publication)
 Centreville Press (Local News Paper)

Notable people
 Matt Downs, former Major League Baseball player, current Marion Military Institute baseball coach
 Franklin Potts Glass Sr., newspaper publisher and U.S. Senator-designate
 Henry James, former NBA player
 Ben Jones, offensive lineman for the Tennessee Titans
 Zac Stacy, former Vanderbilt University football player and running back for the New York Jets
 Fresco Thompson, major league baseball player and executive
 Dr. John B Waits MD, family Dr., and founder and current CEO of Cahaba Medical Care.

References

Further reading
 Bibb County, Alabama: The First Hundred Years, by Rhoda C. Ellison
 "Bibb County", by Vicky Clemmons, David Daniel, Centreville Historic Preservation Commission
 Bloody Bibb, by Verrell Donald Elam. Elam Enterprises, 1985. 192 pages

External links

 City of Centreville official website
 Bibb County Public School District
 Bibb County High School
 Bibb County Chamber of Commerce
 Cahawba Christian Academy
 The Bibb Voice
 WBIB Radio

Populated places established in 1823
Cities in Alabama
Cities in Bibb County, Alabama
County seats in Alabama
Birmingham metropolitan area, Alabama